Julia Carin Cavazos (born November 13, 1993), known professionally as Julia Michaels, is an American singer and songwriter.

Born in Iowa and raised in California, Michaels began her career writing for other artists. Following her success as a writer, she released her debut single with Republic Records in 2017, "Issues", which peaked at number 11 on the Billboard Hot 100 in the United States and was certified quintuple-platinum by the Recording Industry Association of America (RIAA). Her major-label debut extended play, Nervous System (2017), peaked at number 48 on the Billboard 200 chart in the United States. She has since toured alongside Maroon 5, Keith Urban, and Niall Horan and has appeared on the UK top 20 with hits "If the World Was Ending" with JP Saxe and "I Miss You" with Clean Bandit.

As a songwriter, Michaels has written songs for artists including Selena Gomez, Demi Lovato, Fifth Harmony, Shawn Mendes, Britney Spears, Justin Bieber, Hailee Steinfeld, and Gwen Stefani. She has earned two Billboard Hot 100 number one songs with Bieber's "Sorry" and Gomez's "Lose You to Love Me".

Michaels has also received five Grammy Award nominations, two of which were for Song of the Year and also for Best New Artist, as well as nominations from MTV Video Music Awards, Billboard Music Awards, and American Music Awards.

Early life 
Julia Michaels was born in Davenport, Iowa, but moved to Santa Clarita, California, about 35 miles northeast of Los Angeles, with her family including her older sister Jaden who is also a songwriter. Her father is of Mexican and Puerto Rican descent. He changed his name from Juan Manuel Cavazos to John Michaels to pursue an acting career. Michaels began singing at age 12. When she was 14, she met songwriter Joleen Belle, with whom she wrote the theme song to Austin & Ally and many other songs for TV and film. At 19, she met Lindy Robbins, with whom she wrote "Fire Starter" for Demi Lovato and "Miss Movin' On" for Fifth Harmony.

Michaels has said her inspirations include Fiona Apple, Lisa Mitchell, Laura Marling, Missy Higgins, Paramore, Juliet Simms, Sarah Blasko, and The Fray. Michaels had been writing in the Hollywood Pop Circuits since she was 16. When she was 20, she met her songwriting partner Justin Tranter with whom she frequently collaborates. She is credited with writing hits for artists including Justin Bieber, Selena Gomez, R5 and Fifth Harmony. Together with the Norwegian musician Kygo she performed "Carry Me" at the closing ceremony of the 2016 Summer Olympics in Rio de Janeiro, Brazil.

Career 
In January 2017, Michaels released her first solo single, "Issues". According to Michaels, many big-name artists fought for the song, but she kept it for herself. She said, "It was the first time I'd written a song that sounded so much like myself that I couldn't picture anyone else singing it." In April 2017, her new song "How Do We Get Back to Love" was premiered on the HBO series Girls. Michaels's EP Nervous System was released on July 28, 2017. Her second single "Uh Huh" was released on June 2, 2017. From November 25 to December 6, 2017, Michaels was the opening act for Shawn Mendes's Illuminate World Tour on the Oceania Leg.

At the 2018 Grammy Awards, she was nominated for two awards, Best New Artist and Song of the Year for "Issues". On February 8, 2018, "Heaven" was released which was included in the soundtrack for the film Fifty Shades Freed. On May 4, 2018, "Jump" was released featuring Trippie Redd. From March 12 to May 12, 2018, Julia was the opening act for the European dates of Niall Horan's Flicker World Tour.

From May 30 to October 15, 2018, Michaels was the opening act for Maroon 5's Red Pill Blues Tour on the North American leg. She collaborated with Lauv on the single "There's No Way", released September 27, 2018. In November 2018, she appeared on the soundtrack to the Disney film Ralph Breaks the Internet, where she performed "In This Place", a pop rendition of the film's musical number "A Place Called Slaughter Race."

On December 21, 2018, Michaels was featured on 5 Seconds of Summer's song, "Lie to Me". "Lie to Me" charted in multiple countries and was later certified platinum in Australia and Gold in Canada.

From January 23 to February 5, 2019, Michaels opened for Keith Urban on the Australian leg of his Graffiti U World Tour. On January 24, 2019, Michaels released her EP, Inner Monologue Part 1. In June 2019, she began teasing songs from Inner Monologue Part 2, including "17" and "Falling for Boys".

On May 11, 2020, Michaels appeared in the second-season episode of Songland and released the song "Give It to You".

On October 1, 2020, Michaels released the song "Lie Like This" as the lead single from her forthcoming debut studio album. On March 26, 2021, "All Your Exes" was released. On April 14, Michaels announced the title of her album, Not in Chronological Order, and its release date of April 30, 2021.

Personal life 
After collaborating on "There's No Way", Michaels and fellow artist Lauv were in a relationship for several months at the end of 2018.

In July 2019, Michaels started dating Canadian musician JP Saxe. This relationship arose from their collaboration on the duet, "If the World Was Ending". In September 2022, it was reported that they broke up.

Filmography

Discography 

 Not in Chronological Order (2021)

Tours 
Headlining
 Inner Monologue Tour (2019)

Opening act
 Shawn Mendes – Illuminate World Tour (2017)
 Niall Horan – Flicker World Tour (2018)
 Maroon 5 – Red Pill Blues Tour (2018)
 Keith Urban – Graffiti U World Tour (2019)
 Pink – Beautiful Trauma World Tour (2018)

Awards and nominations

References

External links 
 
 
 
 
 

American women songwriters
Songwriters from California
Living people
1993 births
People from Davenport, Iowa
People from Santa Clarita, California
American women pop singers
American dance musicians
Republic Records artists
American musicians of Puerto Rican descent
Hispanic and Latino American musicians
21st-century American singers
21st-century American women singers
Hispanic and Latino American women singers